Military meteorology is meteorology applied to military purposes, by armed forces or other agencies. It is one of the most common fields of employment for meteorologists.

World War II brought great advances in meteorology as large-scale military land, sea, and air campaigns were highly dependent on weather, particularly forecasts provided by the Royal Navy, Met Office and USAAF for the Normandy landing and strategic bombing.

University meteorology departments grew rapidly as the military services sent cadets to be trained as weather officers. Wartime technological developments such as radar also proved to be valuable meteorological observing systems. More recently, the use of satellites in space has contributed extensively to military meteorology.

Military meteorologists currently operate with a wide variety of military units, from aircraft carriers to special forces.

Military meteorology in the United States

United States Navy/Marine Corps

Chain of command
Naval Meteorology and Oceanography Command
Fleet Numerical Meteorology and Oceanography Center

Enlisted

Enlisted meteorology and oceanography forecasters are called aerographer's mates.

Officer
Naval meteorology and oceanography officers are restricted line officers in the Information Dominance Corps.

Notable military meteorologists
Capt Homer A. McCrerey, USNA Class of 1942, fleet meteorologist and oceanographer (FNMOC) (1967–1972)
Gp Capt James Martin Stagg, military meteorologist for Operation Overlord 1944

See also

 U.S. Air Force Weather Agency
 U.S. Air Force Special Operations Weather Technician
 Navy Operational Global Atmospheric Prediction System
 Weather forecasting for Operation Overlord

Further reading
 John F. Fuller (1974), Weather and War, Military Airlift Command, U.S. Air Force
 Thomas Haldane, War History of the Australian Meteorological Service in the Royal Australian Air Force April 1941 to July 1946, accessed at Australian Science and Technology Heritage Centre, University of Melbourne  August 2, 2006
 Timothy C. Spangler, The COMET program: A decade of professional development for our civilian and military weather services, abstract of paper at 13th Symposium on Education, 2004, American Meteorological Society, accessed August 2, 2006
 Overview of U.S. military satellite systems for meteorology
 Col. Tamzy J. House et al. (1996) Weather as a Force Multiplier:Owning the Weather in 2025, accessed August 2, 2006
 Historical bibliography at ibiblio.org

External links
 U.S. Navy Fleet Numerical Meteorology and Oceanography Center, public website
 Air Force Weather Agency, public website
 Cold Fronts, a book by and about a Cold War-era Air Force meteorologist

References

 
Branches of meteorology
Oceanography